Nurman Avia was an airline based in Jakarta, Indonesia. It operated passenger and cargo charters out of Soekarno-Hatta International Airport, Jakarta.

History 
The airline was established in 1997 as a sister company to HeavyLift Indonesia, operating charter flights on behalf of Bouraq Indonesia Airlines and Sempati Air. In 2007, the airline was shut down.

Fleet 
As of March 2007 the Nurman Avia fleet included the following aircraft:

 Fokker F28 Mk4000

References 

Defunct airlines of Indonesia
Airlines established in 1997
Airlines disestablished in 2007
1997 establishments in Indonesia
2007 disestablishments in Indonesia